Korail Cycling Team is a South Korean UCI Continental cycling team, established in 2012 to compete from the start of the 2013 season.

Team roster

Major wins
2014
Stage 6 Tour de Korea, Kyung-Gu Jang

2016
Stage 6 Tour de Singkarak, Kyung-Gu Jang

National champions
2015
 National Time Trial, Jang Kyung-gu

References

External links

UCI Continental Teams (Asia)
Cycling teams established in 2012
Cycling teams based in South Korea
2012 establishments in South Korea